Michael Joseph "Ozzie" Myers (born May 4, 1943) is an American politician who served in the United States House of Representatives from 1976 to 1980. A member of the Democratic Party, Myers became involved in the Abscam scandal during his tenure in Congress and was later expelled from the House of Representatives after being caught taking bribes in an FBI sting operation. He spent three years in federal prison.

In 2020, he was accused of stuffing ballot boxes in Philadelphia elections during the 2010s, and charged with election fraud. He pled guilty in 2022, and was sentenced to  years in federal prison.

Early life
Myers was born on May 4, 1943 in Philadelphia. In 1963, Myers was arrested for burglary but was later acquitted.

Career

State legislature
In December 1970, Michael Joseph Sullivan, his cousin who later served as an election judge while incarcerated, killed a construction worker during a union dispute. It was revealed in 1974 by The Philadelphia Inquirer that Myers was in possession of the gun used while he himself was lobbying against Philadelphia's gun registration law. In August 1975 the state House voted 176 to 1 in favor of removing Representative Leonard Sweeney after he was sentenced to three years in prison for his involvement in a phony accident organization with Myers as the only nay.

In 1975, the state legislature was voting on an appropriations bill to allocate $23 million for Philadelphia's United States Bicentennial celebrations, but was defeated on October 15. The bill was brought up for another vote by Myers who was told by Appropriations Committee Chairman Stephen Wojdak to send it back to the Appropriations Committee, but Myers stated that the bill had enough support to pass and put it up for a vote. The bill was defeated with 107 to 88 voting to reject it.

House of Representatives
On July 2, 1976, he was given the Democratic nomination to run in the special election to fill the first congressional district seat following William A. Barrett's death. In 1979 Representative Ronald M. Mottl proposed a constitutional amendment that would ban forced busing and Myers supported the amendment.

In 1979, he got into a fight with a security guard and a 19-year-old female cashier in an elevator leading from the rooftop lounge of a Quality Inn motel in Arlington, Virginia, punching and kicking them. Myers became combative after they told him to turn down the music at a party he was having in the motel, shouting, "I'm a congressman: we don't have to be quiet." He was subsequently charged with assault and battery, and eventually pleaded no contest to a charge of disorderly conduct three months later. He received a six-month suspended sentence.

Myers was involved in the Abscam scandal. He was videotaped accepting a bribe of $50,000 from undercover FBI agents on August 22, 1979. On that tape, Myers is recorded saying that "money talks in this business and bullshit walks." Myers was expelled from the House of Representatives on October 2, 1980, by a vote of 376 to 30, becoming the first member of the House to be expelled since 1861. Myers was defeated by Thomas M. Foglietta (D) in the 1980 election. Myers was then convicted of bribery and conspiracy and sentenced to three years in prison in 1981.

Later life
After release, Myers started his own political consulting firm.

Myers was accused of conspiring to violate voting rights by fraudulently stuffing the ballot boxes for specific candidates in the 2014, 2015, 2016, 2017, and 2018 elections. He was charged on July 21, 2020 with bribery of an election official, falsification of records, voting more than once in federal elections, and obstruction of justice.

The charges included conspiring with and bribing Domenick J. Demuro, the former Judge of Elections for the 39th Ward, 36th Division. Demuro pleaded guilty in May 2020 in federal court in Philadelphia that he was responsible for overseeing the entire election process and all voter activities of his division in accordance with federal and state election laws. On June 6, 2022, Myers pled guilty to those new charges. On September 27, 2022, he was sentenced to  years in federal prison by Judge Paul S. Diamond.

Electoral history

See also
List of American federal politicians convicted of crimes
List of federal political scandals in the United States
List of United States representatives expelled, censured, or reprimanded

References

External links

Pennsylvania House of Representatives page
The Political Graveyard
Former Congressman Charged with Ballot Stuffing, Bribery, and Obstruction

|-

|-

1943 births
21st-century American criminals
20th-century American politicians
Abscam
American people convicted of assault
American politicians convicted of fraud
Democratic Party members of the United States House of Representatives from Pennsylvania
Expelled members of the United States House of Representatives
Living people
Democratic Party members of the Pennsylvania House of Representatives
Pennsylvania politicians convicted of crimes
Politicians convicted of bribery under 18 U.S.C. § 201
Politicians convicted of conspiracy to defraud the United States
Politicians convicted under the Travel Act
Politicians from Philadelphia
Prisoners and detainees of the United States federal government